On 21 September 2008 at 10 pm local time, in the Ghulam Khan town of North Waziristan District Pakistani soldiers fired on two American helicopter gunships that entered Pakistani airspace with 12.7 mm heavy machine guns. The helicopters stopped and hovered for a while, before returning over the border to Afghanistan without retaliation. It is unknown if any of the helicopters sustained any damage in this first incident.

Thirty minutes later, two gunships attempted to cross the border again at the same place. Pakistani regular and Frontier Corps troops fired warning shots into the air and away from the helicopters, causing the helicopters to turn back without attacking any targets in Pakistan.

References

International incidents
Pakistan–United States military relations